Fade In is a movie-related website. It began as a print magazine in 1993, but is now online-only.

History 
The publication was originally introduced as a screenwriting trade magazine in 1993, but repositioned itself in 2001 as a national consumer movie magazine to compete with Premiere. The founder is Audrey Kelly. It ceased publication as a print magazine in 2007 and is now online-only. The founding editor, Audrey Kelly, still oversees the content as editor.

References

External links 
 

Film magazines published in the United States
Online magazines published in the United States
Defunct magazines published in the United States
Magazines established in 1993
Magazines disestablished in 2007
Online magazines with defunct print editions